The 2003 Montana State Bobcats football team was an American football team that represented Montana State University in the Big Sky Conference during the 2003 NCAA Division I-AA football season. In their fourth season under head coach Mike Kramer, the Bobcats compiled a 7–6 record (5–2 against Big Sky opponents) and finished in a three-way tie for the Big Sky championship with Montana and Northern  Arizona. Montana State lost to Northern Iowa in the first round of the  NCAA Division I-AA Football Championship playoffs and ranked No. 21 in the final I-AA poll by The Sports Network.

Schedule

References

Montana State
Montana State Bobcats football seasons
Big Sky Conference football champion seasons
Montana State Bobcats football